The Portuguese Nun is a 2009 French-Portuguese film by Eugène Green.

Plot
French actor Julie (Leonor Baldaque) travels to Lisbon to shoot a film based on the Letters of a Portuguese Nun. Though her mother was Portuguese, she has never visited Lisbon before, having always holidayed in Porto, and so she decides to make the most of the trip to explore the city. She encounters a variety of Lisbon's inhabitants: an orphan (Francisco Mozos), a suicidal aristocrat (Diogo Dória), the reincarnation of King Sebastião I (Carloto Cotta) and an enigmatic nun (Ana Moreira).

Cast
 Leonor Baldaque as Julie
 Eugène Green as Denis Verde, the director
 Diogo Dória as D. Henrique Cunha
 Ana Moreira as Irma Joana, the nun
 Francisco Mozos as Vasco, the boy
 Adrien Michaux as Martin Dautand
 Beatriz Batarda as Madalena
 Carloto Cotta as D. Sebastião

References

External links
 

2009 films
Portuguese multilingual films
French multilingual films
2009 multilingual films